The decade of the 1020s in art involved some significant events.

Events

Paintings

Births
 1020: Guo Xi – Chinese landscape painter who lived during the Northern Song dynasty (died 1090)

Deaths
 1028: Lin Bu - Chinese poet and calligrapher (born 967)
 1027: Fujiwara no Yukinari - Japanese calligrapher (shodoka) during the Heian period (born 972)
 1022: Ibn al-Bawwab – Arabic calligrapher and illuminator (b. unknown)

Art
Years of the 11th century in art